George Colligan (born December 29, 1969) is an American jazz pianist, organist, drummer, trumpeter, educator, composer, and bandleader.

Early life and education
Colligan was born in New Jersey and raised in Columbia, Maryland. He attended the Peabody Institute, majoring in classical trumpet and music education. In high school he learned to play the drums and later switched to piano. His playing is influenced by Chick Corea, Miles Davis, Herbie Hancock, Thelonious Monk, Wayne Shorter, and McCoy Tyner.

Career 
As a sideman, he has worked with Phil Woods, Gary Bartz, Robin Eubanks, Billy Higgins, Lee Konitz, Nicholas Payton, Steve Wilson, Richard Bona, Cassandra Wilson, Christian McBride, Buster Williams, Al Foster, Don Byron, Benny Golson, Lonnie Plaxico, and Vanessa Rubin.
Colligan received a Chamber Music America Award for composition and won the Jazzconnect.com Award. He has released over twenty albums as a leader and has recorded on over 100 albums as a sideman.

Colligan has performed at festivals all over the world, including the North Sea Jazz Festival, the Edinburgh Jazz & Blues Festival, Vancouver International Jazz Festival, and the Cancun Jazz Festival. In 2007, for the first time, he played trumpet with the trio Mr. Trumpet at the annual Festival of New Trumpet Music in New York City. He taught at the Juilliard School.

In September 2009, Colligan moved to Winnipeg to teach at the University of Manitoba. He taught jazz history, piano, drums, trumpet, and led  master classes. He was songwriter-in-residence at Aqua Books from February to March 2011. In July 2011, Colligan moved to Portland, Oregon, to teach at Portland State University.

Personal life 
Colligan is married to jazz pianist Kerry Politzer.

Discography

As leader

As sideman
With Lee Konitz
Pride (SteepleChase, 1999)
With Gary Thomas
Found on Sordid Streets (Winter & Winter, 1997)
With Noah Becker
Where We Are (ENTOUR, 2000)
With Buster Williams
Griot Libertè (HighNote, 2004)

References

External links
georgecolligan.com

1969 births
Living people
American jazz pianists
American male pianists
SteepleChase Records artists
20th-century American pianists
21st-century American pianists
20th-century American male musicians
21st-century American male musicians
American male jazz musicians
Origin Records artists
Criss Cross Jazz artists
Whirlwind Recordings artists